UC San Diego Central Campus station is a San Diego Trolley station located in the UC San Diego campus. The elevated station is located within the Pepper Canyon Living & Learning Community, with dormitories to the west and east. The station opened on November 21, 2021, as a new station on the Blue Line, constructed as part of the Mid-Coast Trolley extension project.

Station layout 
There are two tracks, each served by a side platform.

References 

Blue Line (San Diego Trolley)
San Diego Trolley stations in San Diego
Railway stations in the United States opened in 2021
Railway stations in California at university and college campuses